69 Aquilae, abbreviated 69 Aql, is a star in the equatorial constellation of Aquila. 69 Aquilae is its Flamsteed designation. It is visible to the naked eye with an apparent visual magnitude of 4.91. The star is moving closer to the Earth with a heliocentric radial velocity of −22.5 km/s. 

The stellar classification of 69 Aquilae is K1/2 III, which means this is an evolved giant star. It belongs to a sub-category called the red clump, indicating that it is on the horizontal branch and is generating energy through helium fusion at its core. The star is about 3.4 billion years old with 1.54 times the mass of the Sun and has expanded to 11 times the Sun's radius. It is radiating 45.7 times the Sun's luminosity from its enlarged photosphere at an effective temperature of 4,529 K.

References

K-type giants
Horizontal-branch stars
Aquila (constellation)
Durchmusterung objects
Aquilae, 69
195135
101101
7831